Windows Live for TV (codenamed Orbit, previously Nemo) is a Windows Media Center application that was part of Microsoft's Windows Live services. It provides users to access Windows Live Spaces, Messenger, and Call on their large-screen monitors or TVs using their PC.

The goal of Windows Live for TV was to bring social networking to a new form factor that is both intuitive and fun to use. The application is built using Windows Presentation Foundation (.NET Framework 3.0) and runs within Windows Media Center or directly in Windows Vista's Internet Explorer 7.0 browser.

Planned features of Windows Live for TV included:
Browse Windows Live Spaces in 3D graphics with new "Gallery" views and full keyword search 
Real-time text and voice conversations with Windows Live Messenger
Call your friends' mobile or landline telephones with Windows Live Call to make affordable domestic and international calls
Make free PC-to-PC calls to other Windows Live Messenger users
Easily navigate with a mouse, keyboard or a TV remote (remote navigation requires Windows Media Center Remote and Infrared Adapter)

Although beta versions of this service have been released, only Spaces functionality is available. A Program Manager has stated that development has ceased, and the service will be shut down on June 24, 2008. The Windows Live for TV team blog has not been updated for a year, while the WPF/XBAP technology used in Windows Live for TV was deprecated by Microsoft in Windows Media Center SDK 5.3.

Requirements

Windows Live for TV requires the following system requirements prior to installation:
Windows Vista Home Premium (x86) or Ultimate Edition (x86)
DirectX 9 GPU (with WDDM and Pixel Shader 2.0 support)
Windows Media Center remote and Infrared adapter
1GB of RAM
A speaker and headphone for PC-to-PC phone and video calling
A Webcam for PC-to-PC video calling

See also
 Windows Live
 Windows Live Spaces
 Windows Live Messenger

References

External links
In Orbit Official Team Blog
Windows Live for TV beta sign-up page

TV